Football at the 1999 Southeast Asian Games took place in Brunei between 30 July and 14 August 1999. It was the last men's football tournament of the Southeast Asian Games to be played without an age limit.

Venues 
All venues located in the capital, Bandar Seri Begawan.
Berakas Track and Field Complex – also known as Belapan
Berakas Sports Complex
Sultan Hassanal Bolkiah Stadium

Squads

Group stage

Group A

Group B

Knockout stage

Semi-finals

Bronze medal match

Gold medal match

Winners

Medal winners

Goalscorers 

6 goals
 Kiatisuk Senamuang

4 goals
 Sakesan Pituratana
 Lê Huỳnh Đức
 Đặng Phương Nam

3 goals
 Hok Sochetra
 Bima Sakti
 Ahmad Shahrul Azhar Sofian
 Myo Hlaing Win
 Indra Sahdan Daud
 Tawan Sripan
 Văn Sỹ Hùng

2 goals
 Mohd Said Abdullah
 Bambang Pamungkas
 Rochi Putiray
 Azizul Kamaluddin
 Rusdi Suparman
 Wan Rohaimi Wan Ismail
 Marlon Piñero
 Nazri Nasir
 Choketawee Promrut
 Jatupong Thongsukh
 Thawatchai Damrong-Ongtrakul

1 goal
 Sallehuddin Haji Damit
 Haji Rosaidi Kamis
 Chan Arunreath
 Oum Sophanarith
 Ali Sunan
 Andrian Mardiansyah
 Harianto Prasetyo
 Uston Nawawi
 Bounlap Khenkittisack
 Bounmy Thamavongsa
 Chalan Louang-Amath
 Soubinh Keophet
 Asmawi Bakiri
 Win Htaik
 Norman Fegidero
 Ahmad Latiff Khamaruddin
 Mohd Noor Ali
 Zulkarnaen Zainal
 Anuruck Srikerd
 Dusit Chalermsan
 Surachai Jaturapattarapong
 Tananchai Boriban
 Worrawoot Srimaka
 Nguyen Hong Son
 Triệu Quang Hà
 Trương Việt Hoàng

Final ranking

References 
Southeast Asian Games 1999 – Details, RSSSF

Sou
1999 Southeast Asian Games
Football at the Southeast Asian Games
1999